Lara Merrett (born 1971) is an Australian visual artist who lives and works in Melbourne, Australia.

References

External links
 Lara Merrett

1971 births
Living people
Australian painters
Australian women painters
21st-century Australian women artists
21st-century Australian artists